Hyde Park Schools is a private Christian K-12 located in Austin, Texas. Hyde Park has two campuses: the Speedway Campus for 4K through 8th grades campus and the Quarries Campus for high school.

History 

Hyde Park High School was founded in 1980, and is associated with the Baptist denomination of Christianity. Hyde Park has a college-preparatory program that emphasizes Christian values.

Campuses 

Hyde Park High School is a ministry of Hyde Park Baptist Church in Austin, Texas. The High School is located at 11400 N. Mopac, Austin, Texas. Enrollment generally runs from 200-300 students. It moved to this location in the fall of 2009. Before this time it was located at 3901 Speedway with the Elementary and Middle School campuses. It was founded in 1980 by Bob Edd Shotwell, who also founded Hyde Park Baptist Elementary in 1968.

Associations 

The school is now a member of the Association of Christian Schools International (ACSI), the Southern Baptist Association of Christian Schools (SBACS), and Texas Association of Private and Parochial Schools (TAPPS).

Extracurricular activities

Sports
Hyde Park athletics is led by athletic director/head football coach Dean Campbell. Dean Campbell has coached at the college football level at many different universities, including the University of Texas, Texas A&M University, Texas Tech, Arkansas, and Air Force. Campbell's goal for Hyde Park athletics is stated as "One foundational goal for our program is to provide strong leadership for our student-athletes through the Christian role models of our coaches."  
 Football
 Volleyball
 Basketball (Boys and Girls)
 Cross Country
 Track
 Soccer (Boys and Girls)
 Golf
 Baseball
 Softball
 Tennis (Boys and Girls)
 Cheerleading
 Ultimate Frisbee
 Flag Football
 Spelling athletes

Fine arts
 Prancers (Drill team)
 Joyful Noise (Honors choir)

References

External links
 Official site

Baptist schools in the United States
Christian schools in Texas
Educational institutions established in 1968
High schools in Austin, Texas
Private high schools in Texas